In Chinese philosophy, wood, sometimes translated as Tree, is the growing of the matter, or the matter's growing stage. Wood is the first phase of Wu Xing. Wood is the lesser yang character of the Five elements, giving birth to Fire. It stands for springtime, the east, the planet Jupiter, the color green, windy weather, and the Azure Dragon (Qing Long) in Four Symbols.
Blue and cyan-type colors also represent wood.

Attributes
In Chinese Taoist thought, Wood attributes are considered to be strength and flexibility, as with bamboo. It is also associated with qualities of warmth, generosity, co-operation and idealism. The Wood person will be expansive, outgoing and socially conscious. The wood element is one that seeks ways to grow and expand. Wood heralds the beginning of life, springtime and buds, sensuality and fecundity. Wood needs moisture to thrive.

In Chinese medicine, wood is associated with negative feelings of anger and positive feelings of optimism, patience and altruism. 

Organs associated with this element are the liver (yin), gall bladder (yang), eyes and tendons.

Astrology
In Chinese astrology, wood is included in the 10 heavenly stems (the five elements in their yin and yang forms), which combine with the 12 earthly branches (or Chinese signs of the zodiac), to form a 60 year cycle.
 Yang wood year (e.g. 1974).
 Yin wood year(e.g. 1975).

Wood governs the Chinese zodiac signs Tiger and Rabbit.

Some astrologers argue for an association between wood and the classical element Aether, on the grounds that ether is associated with Jupiter in Hindu astrology.

Nonetheless, one may also be argue that Ether would correspond to Yang Metal (Spicyness, dryness, astringency, sutility, outer space, emptiness) or Yin Fire (Subtleness,  Allows Growth, Associated to the Soul and the nervous system), and Yin Wood to the Air element and Wind, although confusion can occur because of non-fitting characteristics, as Wu Xing correspond more with the 5 Sub-pranas or Ayurvedic Movements than with the Elements themselves.

Cycle of Wu Xing
In the regenerative cycle of the Wu Xing, water engenders Wood, "as rain or dew makes plant life flourish"; Wood begets fire as "fire is generated by rubbing together two pieces of wood" and it must be fueled by burning wood.
Since wood also represents wind, it also nourishes fire with the flow of oxygen.

In the conquest cycle:

Wood overcomes earth by binding it together with the roots of trees and drawing sustenance from the soil; 

Metal overcomes Wood, as the metal axe can topple the largest trees.
In the less figurative sense, the dryness and coldness of Metal causes wood, trees and plants to dry and wither (like it happens during Autumn).

References

External links
Chinese Astrology - The Wood Element